Katarsis, is a 1963 Italian horror film directed and written by Giuseppe Vegezzi. It is his only film. A group of people enter an old castle where they come across an old man (Christopher Lee) who turns out to be the Devil.

Cast
Credits adapted from the book Italian Gothic Horror, 1957-1969.
 Christopher Lee as Lord of the Castle
 Giorgio Ardisson (credited as George Ardisson) as Gugo
 Vittori Centroni (credited as Lilly Parker) as Maga
 Anita Cacciolata (credited as Anita Deyer) as Jenny
 Alice Paneque (credited as Bella Cortez) as Frie
 Mario Polletin (credited as Mario Zacarti) as Gian
 Adriana Ambesi as Castle lady
 Pietro Vidali (credited as Piero Vada) as Peo

Production
Katarsis was shot at Odescalchi Castle in Bracciano and Montelibretti and Olympia Studios in Romebetween 14 May and 7 June 1963. It had a low budget of 46 million Italian lira. Christopher Lee was one of the few name actors in it; he was on-set for one week. In Lee's autobiography, he states that he never saw the film or its dailies and that it was later split into two films. This is incorrect; however, the film was released in two versions, the later one with more footage.

Release
Katarsis was released in Italy on September 9, 1963 where it was distributed by Mangusta. Shortly after it received its distribution visa, its production company I Della Films filed for bankruptcy. Katarsis was then purchased by Eco Films and re-released in a re-edited version, Sfida al diavolo, in 1965. This latter version runs 78 minutes and includes new scenes involving a dancer.

Reception
Roberto Curti, author of Italian Gothic Horror Films, 1957-1969 described the director's work ranging between "naive and terrible".

See also
Christopher Lee filmography
Italian films of 1963
List of horror films of 1963

References

Footnotes

Sources

External links 

 

1963 horror films
1963 films
Italian horror films
Films shot in Rome
Films set in Italy
Gothic horror films
Films scored by Berto Pisano
Films set in castles
1963 directorial debut films
1960s Italian films